Battle for Bittora is a novel by Indian writer and advertiser Anuja Chauhan. It is her second novel after The Zoya Factor.

Plot
Jinni is a common woman of 25 years, lives in Mumbai, works in an animation studio and is very happy with her ordinary and independent life. Everything is normal until she receives a call from her grandmother telling her that she should return to her hometown Bittora; Jinni does not want to return at first but after frequent calls from her grandmother finally relents.  When she arrives in Bittora she finds a place very different from the one she remembered—one only she can return to normality.

Main characters
 Sarojini Pande (Jinni)
 Zain Altaf Khan
 Gaiman Tagore Rumi
 Pushpa Pande (Jiji)
 Tawny Suleiman
 Rocket Singh

Film adaptation
Hindi film producer, Rhea Kapoor is producing a film based on the novel. , the film is in pre-production.

References

HarperCollins books
Novels set in India
Indian English-language novels
2010 Indian novels